Te Hata Tipoki (1880–1940) was a notable New Zealand tribal leader and land rights activist. Of Māori descent, he identified with the Ngati Kahungunu iwi. He was born in Waihirere, Hawke's Bay, New Zealand in 1880.

In 1935, he was awarded the King George V Silver Jubilee Medal.

References

1880 births
1940 deaths
New Zealand activists
People from the Hawke's Bay Region
Ngāti Kahungunu people